"Hittin' Switches" is a song by American hip hop artist Erick Sermon. The song was released as the first single for Sermon's debut album No Pressure (1993), as well as the second promotional single for the soundtrack to the 1993 film Who's the Man?.

Track listing
7", 12", 45 RPM
"Hittin' Switches (Radio) - 3:55
"Hittin' Switches (Album Version) - 3:55

Chart performance

Notes

External links
 

1993 singles
Erick Sermon songs
Song recordings produced by Erick Sermon
1993 songs
Songs written by Bootsy Collins
Songs written by Erick Sermon
Uptown Records singles